The 1984 NCAA Division I-A football season was topsy-turvy from start to finish.  It ended with the BYU Cougars being bestowed their first and only national championship by beating Michigan in the Holiday Bowl. While the Cougars finished with a perfect 13–0 record and were the consensus National Champions, some commentators maintain this title was undeserved citing their weak schedule (none of their conference opponents in the WAC finished with fewer than four losses, and even Michigan finished the season at 6–6 after the bowl loss) and argue that the championship should have gone to the 11–1 Washington Huskies. Despite this the Cougars were voted No. 1 in the final AP and UPI polls. The Huskies (and five other teams) declined an invitation to play BYU in the Holiday Bowl; they decided instead to play Oklahoma in the more prestigious 1985 Orange Bowl. All subsequent national champions have come from what are now known as the Power Five conferences + Notre Dame.

Rule changes
 Defensive pass interference will be penalized 15 yards from the previous spot if the foul occurs more than 15 yards downfield.  If the foul occurred 15 yards or less downfield, the penalty will be enforced at the spot of the foul.
 Kickoffs that go through the back of the end zone or out of bounds in the end zone in the air untouched will be brought out to the 30-yard line instead of the 20.
 Clipping is limited to an area 6-10 yards from the line of scrimmage.
 Wide receivers are only permitted to block below the waist once the ball passes the line of scrimmage.
 Eliminating the PAT if the game has been decided, and if both teams agree.
 Offensive face-masking is now a foul, penalized 15 yards.

Conference and program changes
 New Mexico State University joined the Pacific Coast Athletic Association from the Missouri Valley Conference.

August-September
The preseason AP Poll was led by No. 1 Auburn, No. 2 Nebraska, No. 3 Pittsburgh, No. 4 Clemson, and No. 5 UCLA.

August 27-September 1: No. 1 Auburn faced off against the defending champion, No. 10 Miami, in the second annual Kickoff Classic. In an early warning of a topsy-turvy year, the Tigers fell 20-18 with Bo Jackson gaining just 96 rushing yards. Five days later, Miami also beat No. 17 Florida 32-20. No. 3 Pittsburgh lost 20-14 to Brigham Young; the Panthers soon dropped out of the polls and finished with a disappointing 3-7-1 record. No. 4 Clemson defeated Appalachian State 40-7. No. 2 Nebraska, No. 5 UCLA, and No. 6 Texas had not begun their seasons, and the next AP Poll featured No. 1 Miami, No. 2 Nebraska, No. 3 Clemson, No. 4 UCLA, and No. 5 Texas.

September 8: No. 1 Miami played their third consecutive ranked opponent, and this time they lost 22-14 to No. 14 Michigan. No. 2 Nebraska began their season with a 42-7 win over Wyoming. No. 3 Clemson shut out Virginia 55-0. No. 4 UCLA struggled to beat San Diego State, and their 18-15 victory dropped them out of the top five in the next poll. No. 5 Texas still had not started their schedule. No. 10 Iowa beat Iowa State 59-21, impressing the voters enough to make a big jump in the next poll: No. 1 Nebraska, No. 2 Clemson, No. 3 Michigan, and No. 4 Texas, with Iowa and Miami tied at No. 5.

September 15: No. 1 Nebraska beat Minnesota 38-7, and No. 2 Clemson was idle. No. 3 Michigan lost 20-11 to No. 16 Washington. No. 4 Texas opened play with a 35-27 victory over No. 11 Auburn, and No. 5 Miami bounced back with a 28-17 win at Purdue. Fellow No. 5 Iowa was less successful, losing 20-17 to No. 12 Penn State. The Hawkeyes’ conference rival, No. 9 Ohio State, shut out Washington State 44-0 and moved up in the next poll: No. 1 Nebraska, No. 2 Clemson, No. 3 Texas, No. 4 Miami, and No. 5 Ohio State.

September 22: No. 1 Nebraska blasted No. 8 UCLA 42-3; they had outscored their first three opponents 122-17. No. 2 Clemson lost 26-23 to No. 20 Georgia on a 60-yard field goal with 11 seconds left. No. 3 Texas was idle. No. 4 Miami took its second loss, a 38-3 blowout by No. 15 Florida State. No. 5 Ohio State defeated No. 14 Iowa 45-26. No. 7 Penn State, which had beaten Iowa the previous week, won 56-18 over William & Mary. No. 10 Boston College hosted North Carolina and won 52-20. The next poll featured No. 1 Nebraska, No. 2 Texas, No. 3 Ohio State, No. 4 Penn State, and No. 5 Boston College.

September 29: No. 1 Nebraska lost 17-9 at Syracuse. No. 2 Texas squared off against No. 4 Penn State and won 28-3. No. 3 Ohio State won 35-22 at Minnesota. No. 5 Boston College was idle. No. 6 Washington dominated Miami-Ohio 53-7, and No. 7 Oklahoma beat Kansas State 24-6. The next poll featured No. 1 Texas, No. 2 Ohio State, No. 3 Washington, No. 4 Boston College, and No. 5 Oklahoma.

October
October 6: No. 1 Texas won 38-13 at Rice, but No. 2 Ohio State was upset 28-23 by Purdue. No. 3 Washington defeated Oregon State 19-7. No. 4 Boston College was again idle, as was No. 5 Oklahoma. No. 7 Brigham Young won 59-9 at Colorado State and moved up in the next poll: No. 1 Texas, No. 2 Washington, No. 3 Oklahoma, No. 4 Boston College, and No. 5 Brigham Young.

October 13: The Red River Shootout between No. 1 Texas and No. 3 Oklahoma ended in a controversial 15-15 tie after the officials nullified an Oklahoma interception in the end zone, allowing the Longhorns to kick a game-tying field goal as time expired. No. 2 Washington moved up with a 37-15 win at Stanford. No. 4 Boston College returned to the field with a 24-10 defeat of Temple. No. 5 Brigham Young struggled to beat Wyoming, edging the Cowboys 41-38, and No. 6 Nebraska’s 33-23 win over Missouri moved them up in the next poll: No. 1 Washington, No. 2 Oklahoma, No. 3 Texas, No. 4 Boston College, and No. 5 Nebraska.

October 20: For the first time all year, the No. 1 and No. 2 teams both won a game on the same weekend. No. 1 Washington defeated Oregon 17-10, and No. 2 Oklahoma made a late comeback to beat Iowa State 12-10. No. 3 Texas won 24-18 over Arkansas, but No. 4 Boston College fell 21-20 to No. 20 West Virginia. No. 5 Nebraska beat Colorado 24-7, and No. 7 Brigham Young defeated Air Force 30-25, moving up in the next poll: No. 1 Washington, No. 2 Oklahoma, No. 3 Texas, No. 4 Nebraska, and No. 5 Brigham Young.

October 25-27: No. 1 Washington hosted Arizona and won 28-12, but No. 2 Oklahoma lost 28-11 at Kansas. No. 3 Texas won 13-7 over No. 14 SMU, No. 4 Nebraska blasted Kansas State 62-14, No. 5 Brigham Young blanked New Mexico 48-0, and No. 9 South Carolina beat East Carolina 42-20. The next poll featured No. 1 Washington, No. 2 Texas, No. 3 Nebraska, No. 4 Brigham Young, and No. 5 South Carolina.

November-December
November 3: No. 1 Washington defeated California 44-14. No. 2 Texas squeaked past Texas Tech 13-10 while No. 3 Nebraska shut out Iowa State 44-0, leading the two teams to switch places in the next poll. No. 4 Brigham Young beat UTEP 42-9, and No. 5 South Carolina won 35-28 over North Carolina State. The next poll featured No. 1 Washington, No. 2 Nebraska, No. 3 Texas, No. 4 Brigham Young, and No. 5 South Carolina.

November 10: No. 1 Washington went from first in the nation to second in their conference, losing 16-7 at No. 14 USC. Since the Trojans had the head-to-head advantage and were one game ahead in the Pac-10 standings with just one more to play, this ensured a Rose Bowl berth for them. No. 2 Nebraska beat Kansas 41-7, but No. 3 Texas lost 29-15 to Houston. After a 6-0-1 start, the Longhorns would go on to lose four of their last five games. Now the only remaining undefeated teams were two decidedly untraditional powers: No. 4 Brigham Young, which defeated San Diego State 34-3, and No. 5 South Carolina, which won 38-26 over No. 11 Florida State. No. 7 Oklahoma State, whose only loss was to Nebraska, beat Missouri 31-13. No. 10 Florida, which had started the season under a cloud as coach Charley Pell was forced to resign due to recruiting violations, had caught fire under interim coach Galen Hall and shut out No. 8 Georgia 27-0 for their seventh straight victory. The next poll featured Nebraska back at No. 1, followed by No. 2 South Carolina, No. 3 Brigham Young, No. 4 Oklahoma State, and No. 5 Florida.

November 17: No. 1 Nebraska finished their season with a disappointing 17-7 loss to No. 6 Oklahoma. No. 2 South Carolina also lost, falling 38-21 to Navy. This opened the door for No. 3 Brigham Young, which moved to the top spot with a 24-14 victory at Utah. No. 4 Oklahoma State defeated Iowa State 16-10, and No. 5 Florida won 25-17 at Kentucky to clinch the SEC title. However, due to the Gators’ recruiting violations, the Sugar Bowl berth would go to the second-place team, No. 9 LSU. No. 8 Washington closed their schedule with a 38-29 win at Washington State. The next poll featured No. 1 Brigham Young, No. 2 Oklahoma, No. 3 Oklahoma State, No. 4 Florida, and No. 5 Washington.

November 23-24: No. 1 Brigham Young finished the year undefeated with a 38-13 win over Utah State. No. 2 Oklahoma and No. 3 Oklahoma State faced off for the Big 8 title, with the Sooners pulling out a 24-14 victory and an Orange Bowl berth. No. 4 Florida was idle, and No. 5 Washington and No. 7 Nebraska had finished their seasons. The famous “Hail Flutie” game also took place this weekend, with No. 10 Boston College defeating No. 12 Miami on a last-second 48-yard touchdown pass by Doug Flutie. The next poll featured No. 1 Brigham Young, No. 2 Oklahoma, No. 3 Florida, No. 4 Washington, and No. 5 Nebraska.

December 1: The only highly-ranked team which had not finished its schedule was No. 3 Florida, which closed with a 27-17 win at No. 12 Florida State. The rankings in the final poll remained the same.

As the champions of the WAC, No. 1 Brigham Young was tied in to the Holiday Bowl, where they would face an underwhelming opponent in unranked Michigan. The highest-ranked bowl matchup was the Orange Bowl between No. 2 Oklahoma and No. 4 Washington. The Sugar Bowl would feature No. 5 Nebraska against No. 11 LSU, the Rose Bowl would pit No. 6 Ohio State, the Big Ten champion, against No. 18 USC, and the Cotton Bowl matched No. 8 Boston College against SWC winner Houston.

Conference standings

AP Final poll

BYU
Washington
Florida
Nebraska
Boston College
Oklahoma
Oklahoma State
SMU
UCLA
USC
South Carolina
Maryland
Ohio State
Auburn
LSU
Iowa
Florida State
Miami (FL)
Kentucky
Virginia

Coaches Final Poll
BYU
Washington
Nebraska
Boston College
Oklahoma State
Oklahoma
Florida
SMU
University of Southern California
UCLA
Maryland
Ohio State
South Carolina
Auburn
Iowa
LSU
Virginia
West Virginia
Kentucky
Florida St.

Notable rivalry games

SMU 26, Texas Christian 17 
Alabama 17, Auburn 15
West Virginia 28, Pitt 10
Texas Christian 38, Baylor 28
Arizona 16, Arizona State 10
Florida State 38, Miami (FL) 3
Florida 27, Florida State 17
Florida 27, Georgia 0
Georgia Tech 35, Georgia 18
Iowa 59, Iowa State 21
LSU 33, Tulane 15
Michigan State 19, Michigan 7
Army 28, Navy 11
Notre Dame 19, USC 7
Ohio State 21, Michigan 6
Oklahoma 17, Nebraska 7
Oklahoma 24, Oklahoma State 14
Oregon 31, Oregon State 6
South Carolina 22, Clemson 21
Texas 15, Oklahoma 15
UCLA 29, USC 10
Washington 38, Washington State 29
Minnesota 17, Wisconsin 14
BYU 24, Utah 14
Texas A&M 37, Texas 12
Pitt 31, Penn State 11
Kansas State 24, Kansas 7

Bowl games

Holiday Bowl: No. 1 Brigham Young 24, Michigan 17
Orange Bowl: No. 4 Washington 28, No. 2 Oklahoma 17
Sugar Bowl: No. 5 Nebraska 28, No. 11 LSU 10
Rose Bowl: No. 18 USC 20, No. 6 Ohio State 17
Cotton Bowl: No. 8 Boston College 45, Houston 28

Other Bowls:
Gator Bowl: No. 9 Oklahoma State 21, No. 7 South Carolina 14
Aloha Bowl: No. 10 Southern Methodist 27, No. 17 Notre Dame 20
Fiesta Bowl: No. 14 UCLA 39, No. 13 Miami (FL) 37
Florida Citrus: No. 15 Florida State 17, Georgia 17
Liberty Bowl: No. 16 Auburn 21, Arkansas 15
Freedom Bowl: Iowa 55, No. 19 Texas 17
Hall of Fame Bowl: Kentucky 20, No. 20 Wisconsin 19
Peach Bowl: Virginia 27, Purdue 24
Sun Bowl:  No. 12 Maryland 28, Tennessee 27
Independence Bowl: Air Force 23, Virginia Tech 7
Bluebonnet Bowl: West Virginia 31, Texas Christian 14
Cherry Bowl: Army 10, Michigan State 6
California Bowl: UNLV 30, Toledo 13

Heisman Trophy voting
The Heisman Trophy is given to the year's most outstanding player

Source:

Other annual awards
Maxwell Award (College Player of the Year) – Doug Flutie, Boston College
Walter Camp Award (Back) – Doug Flutie, Boston College
Davey O'Brien Award (Quarterback) – Doug Flutie, Boston College
Lombardi Award (Lineman or Linebacker) – Tony Degrate, Texas
Outland Trophy (Interior Lineman) – Bruce Smith, Virginia Tech
Paul "Bear" Bryant Award – LaVell Edwards, BYU

References